The Blue Mountain Creek, an intermittent stream that is part of the Macleay River catchment, is located in the Northern Tablelands region of New South Wales, Australia.

Course and features
Blue Mountain Creek rises on the eastern slopes of Blue Mountain, north northeast of Walcha and south southeast of Uralla, within the Great Dividing Range. The river flows generally east, joined by two minor tributaries before reaching its confluence with the Macleay River in the remote country within the Oxley Wild Rivers National Park, upstream of the confluence of the Macleay and Chandler rivers. The river descends  over its  course.

See also

 Rivers of New South Wales
 List of rivers of New South Wales (A-K)
 List of rivers of Australia

References

External links
 
 Northern Rivers Geology Blog - Macleay River

 

Rivers of New South Wales
New England (New South Wales)
Northern Tablelands
Armidale Regional Council